The Federal Tortosa Pact, or simply, Tortosa Pact ( or ), was an ideological manifesto and organizational project from Republican and Federal forces of Aragon, the Balearic Islands, Catalonia and the Valencia region, signed in Tortosa on May 18, 1869. The signing of the pact was one of the first practical expressions of federalism, while still rejecting separatism.

Text

Subsequent developments
The pact led to similar pacts such as those of Córdoba, the two Castiles, Valladolid, the Galician-Asturian pact in Santiago de Compostela, the Basque-Navarran pact at Eibar and lastly the Madrid Agreement of 30 July 1869.

When the First Spanish Republic was established (1873), there were different attempts in Barcelona to proclaim a Catalan State within a Spanish Federal Republic.

See also
Crown of Aragon

References

Politics of Catalonia